The 1992 Utah gubernatorial election took place on November 3, 1992. Republican nominee Michael Leavitt won the three-way election.

Results

References

1992
Gubernatorial
Utah